Pullen Pullen Reserve is a 56,000 hectare property in western Queensland, Australia, designated specifically for the purpose of protecting the endangered night parrot. The exact location has not been released. While the sanctuary was meant only to aid the night parrot, other endangered species residing in the area include the plains wanderer, painted honeyeater, grey falcon, and kowari.

References

Nature reserves in Queensland
Bush Heritage Australia reserves